Edward Popham (1610–1651) was an English naval commander and MP for Minehead.

Edward Popham may also refer to:

Edward Popham (died 1586) (by 1530 –1586), MP for Guildford in 1558, Hythe in 1563, and Bridgwater in 1571, 1572
Edward Popham (MP for Bridgwater) (1581–1641), MP for Bridgwater, 1621 to 1626
Edward Popham (died 1772) (1711–1772), MP for Great Bedwyn, and for Wiltshire